HMS Rhadamanthus was one of the initial steam powered vessels built for the Royal Navy. On 10 January 1831 the First Sea Lord gave orders that four paddle vessels be built to competitive designs. The vessels were to be powered by Maudslay, Son & Field steam engines, carry a schooner rig and mount one or two 10-inch shell guns. Initially classed simply as a steam vessel (SV), she was re-classed as a second-class steam sloop in 1846. Designed by Thomas Roberts, the Master Shipwright of Plymouth. She was launched and completed in 1832, She was converted into a transport in 1841 then in 1851 she was a troopship and by the 1860s she was a transport again. Her breaking was completed in February 1864.

Rhadamanthus was the only named vessel in the Royal Navy.

Design and specifications
Her keel was laid in September 1831 at Plymouth Dockyard and launched on 16 April 1832. Her light draught was  forward and  aft. Her builder's measure tonnage was 813 tons though her displacement was 1,086 tons. Upon launch she was sailed to Woolwich to have her machinery fitted.

Her machinery was supplied by Maudslay, Son & Field of Lambeth. She was fitted with two fire-tube rectangular boilers. Her steam engine was a two-cylinder vertical single expansion (VSE) engine rated at 220 nominal horsepower (NHP). She originally was to have a schooner sail plan, however, this was changed to a barque or barquentine sail rig.

Her armament would initially consist of one Miller's Original 10-inch 84 hundredweight (cwt) muzzle loading smooth bore (MLSB) shell gun on a pivot mount and two Bloomfield's 32-pounder 25 cwt MLSB guns and two 6=pounder brass MLSB guns on broadside trucks. The brass guns were later removed and one 32-pounder 42 cwt MLSB was fitted on a pivot mount.

She was completed on 2 November 1832 at an initial cost of £31,919 (building - £18,534, fitting - £2,197 and machinery - £11,188).

Commissioned Service

First Commission
She was first commissioned on 4 October 1832 for the blockade of the Dutch Coast during the Belgian war of Independence. At the end of the blockade duties she was assigned to the North America and West Indies Station. She returned to Home Water, paying off at Woolwich on 21 April 1835. During 1836 she underwent a major refit at Woolwich Dockyard.

Second Commission
She was recommissioned on 23 October 1836 under Commander John Duffill, RN as a packet vessel for the coast of Spain. On 13 July 1837 Commander Arthur Wakefield took command and assigned to the Mediterranean. She returned to Home Waters to pay off on 20 October 1840. She was refitted as a transport at Sheerness before returning to Woolwich.

Ancillary Service
She commissioned on 28 April 1841 under Thomas Laen, Master at Woolwich. On 29 June she was under Jonathan Aylen, Master. She paid off at Woolwich on 13 February 1849. She was fitted as a troopship in March 1851. She recommissioned under John Belam, Master for Particular Service. John E. Perry, Master (temporary) took over on 17 November 1855, then on 25 January 1856 Edmund P. Cole, Master was in command, following with Frederick R.  Strudee, Master on 29 October 1857 and finally George Raymond, Master on 8 December 1862.

Disposition
She paid off for the last time on 11 June 1863 at Sheerness. Her breaking was completed on 8 February 1864.

Notes

Citations

References
 Lyon Winfield, The Sail & Steam Navy List, All the Ships of the Royal Navy 1815 to 1889, by David Lyon & Rif Winfield, published by Chatham Publishing, London © 2004, Part I, Chapter 3, Paddle Steamers (Wooden), Paddle Sloops
 Winfield, British Warships in the Age of Sail (1817 – 1863), by Rif Winfield, published by Seaforth Publishing, England © 2014, e, Chapter 11 Steam Paddle Vessels, Vessels acquired from November 1830, Rhadamanthus
 Colledge, Ships of the Royal Navy, by J.J. Colledge, revised and updated by Lt Cdr Ben Warlow and Steve Bush, published by Seaforth Publishing, Barnsley, Great Britain, © 2020, e  (EPUB), Section R (Reynard (See Renard) Rhadamanthus)

1832 ships
Ships built in Plymouth, Devon
Paddle sloops of the Royal Navy
Victorian-era sloops of the United Kingdom